The Una River is a river of Bahia state in eastern Brazil. It is a small river that starts in Serra Geral and flows near Iramaia (in the Centro Sul Baiano mesoregion) before discharging into the Paraguaçu River.

See also
List of rivers of Bahia

References

Brazilian Ministry of Transport

Rivers of Bahia